The realignment plan (originally dubbed the convergence plan) was a plan by Israel to unilaterally disengage from 90% of the West Bank and annex the rest, incorporating most Israeli settlements into Israel. The plan was formulated and introduced to the Israeli public by then acting prime minister, Ehud Olmert in a number of media interviews during the election campaign for the 17th Knesset in March 2006. The Convergence Plan was originally scheduled to be implemented within 18 months from early May 2006, but in November 2007, Olmert said that he hoped to implement it within three to four  years.

Outlines of the plan 

The outlines of the plan comprised:
 Assuring a Jewish majority in the Palestinian territories under Israeli control
 A permanent border along the West Bank barrier
 Territorial contiguity for a possible  Palestinian state
 Permanent Israeli sovereignty or control over the three large and expanded settlement blocs, including the E1 area near Jerusalem.
 Definitive Israeli sovereignty over East Jerusalem
 Israeli control over the border zone at the Jordan River

According to the plan, Israeli settlements in 90% of the West Bank would be evacuated and dismantled. The area of evacuation would largely correspond to the area east of the route of the West Bank barrier that was begun under Olmert's predecessor, Ariel Sharon, or a similar route with national consent and international legitimization.
The large Israeli settlement blocs near the Green Line would be annexed to Israel, and the approximately 40,000 residents of the evacuated settlements would be resettled there. During the campaign for the March 2006 election, Sharon was still officially prime minister, but unable to carry out his duties, to communicate or to run in the election due to the major stroke that he suffered on 4 January 2006. Olmert, who became acting prime minister and Kadima party leader after Sharon's stroke, stated that in pursuing a realignment of settlements, he was operating in Sharon's spirit, and that if Sharon had been able to continue carrying out his duties, he would have acted in a similar way.

Suspension of the plan 

After the 2006 Lebanon War, Olmert announced to his cabinet that the plan to dismantle some Jewish settlements in the West Bank and unilaterally redraw Israel's borders would not be implemented for the time being. The plan was not revived prior to Olmert's departure from office on 31 March 2009 and the subsequent Likud-led coalition governments have not pursued similar policies. Olmert's successors Tzipi Livni and Shaul Mofaz are also opposed to the proposals.

2007 revised plan 

In July 2007, then Israeli deputy prime minister Haim Ramon proposed a smaller-scale realignment plan, in which Israel would disengage from 70% of the West Bank, and evacuate settlements in the area of withdrawal, mainly isolated communities.

English renaming 
Although the Hebrew name of the plan did not change, the English name rapidly changed from "convergence" to "consolidation" and finally to "realignment", according to the Washington Times. and the "language maven" William Safire.

New Historian Ilan Pappé noted that "hitkansut" (the Hebrew word used for the plan) most aptly translates as "ingathering". Pappé said that the plan was designed to address the "demographic threat" posed by Palestinian population growth to the maintenance of a "Jewish state", by leaving several populous Palestinian areas outside direct Israeli control.

Opinions 

In two polls of Israeli opinion on the plan conducted on behalf of the Yisrael Beiteinu political party, some 70% of respondents said that they were opposed to the plan. The polls also revealed that some 65-70% of those who backed Israel's disengagement from Gaza in 2005 opposed the plan.

The European Union opposed the plan, stating that it would not recognize any unilateral border changes that were not agreed upon in negotiations, although the EU External Relations Commissioner said that it was a "courageous idea". Palestinian Authority president Mahmoud Abbas opposed the plan, and called on all Arab states to oppose it, stating that "we are working to get Olmert's plan off the table". Jordanian king Abdullah II and Egyptian president Hosni Mubarak released a joint statement expressing opposition to "unilateral Israeli steps" and that "every step should be carried out through direct negotiations with the Palestinian side and in accordance with the Road Map, which leads to a sustainable Palestinian state alongside Israel", following a meeting in Sharm el-Sheikh.

See also
Israeli disengagement from Gaza
Annapolis Conference
 Palestinian Prisoners' Document
 Homesh First
 Yossi Dagan

References

External links
Map of the Convergence Plan, April 2006. IMEU/Stop the Wall

Israeli–Palestinian peace process
Politics of Israel